The Canal de la Vielle Autize is a canal in western France connecting Courdault to the river Sèvre Niortaise near Damvix. It is 10 km long and has one lock.

See also
 List of canals in France

References

External links
 Project Bable

Autize
Canals opened in 1833